The Batéké Plateau is located around the border between the Republic of Congo and Gabon. In both countries it gave name to departments:
 Plateaux Department in Haut-Ogooué Province, Gabon
 Plateaux Department, which is a first-level subdivision in Congo.

The reaches between 550 and 830 metres, and is rich in manganese. The Bateke Plateau is an ancient volcanic area.

Several rivers rise in that area, including the Niari River, which flows in Congo, the  Ogooue, Mpassa, Ndjoumou, Lekabi and Lekey Rivers which flow in Gabon.

See also
 Batéké Plateau National Park

References
 Perusset André. 1983. Oro-Hydrographie(Le Relief) in Geographie et Cartographie du Gabon, Atlas Illustré led by The Ministère de l'Education Nationale de la Republique Gabonaise. Pg 10–13. Paris, France: Edicef.
 Petringa, Maria. Brazza, A Life for Africa. Bloomington, IN: AuthorHouse, 2006. .  Describes Pierre Savorgnan de Brazza's extensive explorations of the Ogoué River basin.

Landforms of Gabon
Plateaus of Africa
Western Congolian forest–savanna mosaic